Diplotoxa messoria is a species of fly in the family Chloropidae, the grass flies. It is found in the  Palearctic . The larva feeds on Poaceae

References

Chloropinae
Insects described in 1820